Hokey means corny, mawkishly sentimental, or obviously contrived.

Hokey can also refer to:

Arts, entertainment, and media
 Hokey, the name of a particular House-elf in the fictional Harry Potter series
Hokey cokey (AKA hokey pokey), a participation dance
 Hokey Wolf, a Hanna-Barbera cartoon character

Other uses
 Hokey, Handover Keying technologies addressing seamless migration of secure wireless connections from one network to another
 Hokey, misspelling of Hokie, the mascot of Virginia Tech

See also
Hokey pokey (disambiguation)